Giorgos Makris (born 15 November 1984) is a Greek professional footballer, who plays for Pierikos.

Club career
Makris started his playing career with PAOK. On 6 July 2010, he signed an annual contract with Kerkyra. In May 2011 he signed for Atromitos. On 28 January 2012, Makris was loaned out to Anorthosis Famagusta of the Cypriot First Division. He was released from Atromitos in December 2012. Shortly afterwards, in January 2013, he signed for OFI Crete. He left OFI in January 2015, due to the club's financial difficulties. On 24 July 2015, Makris signed an annual contract with Greek Superleague side Iraklis. After being released by Iraklis in late 2015, he signed a 1,5 years' contract with Italian Lega Pro club Pisa. 
On 12 June 2016 Pisa gained promotion to Serie B after seven years by defeating Maceratese (3–1), Pordenone (3–0 on aggregate) and Foggia in the two-legged play-off final (5–3 on aggregate), while Makris had a substantial contribution.

Honours

Club
PAOK
Greek Cup: 2003

References

External links
uefa.com profile
Onsports.gr profile 
myplayer.gr profile
Greek Superleague profile

1984 births
Living people
Greek footballers
Atromitos F.C. players
A.O. Kerkyra players
Pierikos F.C. players
Olympiacos Volos F.C. players
PAOK FC players
Anorthosis Famagusta F.C. players
OFI Crete F.C. players
Iraklis Thessaloniki F.C. players
Pisa S.C. players
Doxa Drama F.C. players
Super League Greece players
Football League (Greece) players
Cypriot First Division players
Greek expatriate footballers
Expatriate footballers in Cyprus
Expatriate footballers in Italy
Association football midfielders
Footballers from Kavala